Mohamed Seguer (born 7 September 1985) is an Algerian football player who is currently playing as a forward for WA Tlemcen in the Algerian Ligue Professionnelle 1.

Career
In 2012, he signed a two-year contract with USM Alger.
In 2012, he signed a two-year contract with MC Alger.
In 2019, he signed a two-year contract with RC Relizane.
In 2019, he signed a two-year contract with WA Tlemcen.

Honours

Club
 ES Sétif
 Algerian Ligue Professionnelle 1 (1): 2008–09

 ASO Chlef
 Algerian Ligue Professionnelle 1 (1): 2010–11

 USM Alger
 Algerian Ligue Professionnelle 1 (2): 2013–14, 2015–16
 Algerian Cup (1): 2013
 Algerian Super Cup (1): 2013
 UAFA Club Cup (1): 2013

 USM Bel Abbès
 Algerian Cup (1): 2018

References

External links
 

1985 births
Algeria international footballers
Algeria A' international footballers
Algeria under-23 international footballers
Algerian Ligue Professionnelle 1 players
Algerian footballers
ASO Chlef players
ES Sétif players
JS Kabylie players
Living people
MC Saïda players
MC Alger players
USM Alger players
People from Relizane
RC Relizane players
USM Bel Abbès players
Association football forwards
21st-century Algerian people